Lisa Dawn Falkenberg (born July 12, 1978) is an American journalist. She is the Houston Chronicle vice president/editor of opinion.

Early life and education
Falkenberg was born on July 12, 1978, and raised in Seguin, Texas.

She began her career as a journalist writing for her high school newspaper.  She attended the University of Texas at Austin and was awarded a degree in journalism in 2000.

Journalism career
For the next four years, Falkenberg worked for the Associated Press.  In 2004, she was named the Texas AP writer of the year.  The following year, she became a state correspondent for the Houston Chronicle.  She became a columnist for that paper in 2007.

In 2022, She shared the prize for Editorial Writing with Michael Lindenberger, Joe Holley and Luis Carrasco
 
In 2014, Falkenberg's editor nominated her for the Pulitzer Prize for commentary.  She was one of two finalists, but did not win.  The following year, she won the Pulitzer Prize for commentary, for a series of columns she had written about corrupt grand jury practices in Texas.  The Pulitzer announcement noted that her win stemmed from "vividly-written, groundbreaking columns about grand jury abuses that led to a wrongful conviction and other egregious problems in the legal and immigration systems."

References

External links

2015 Pulitzer nomination package

1978 births
21st-century American journalists
21st-century American women writers
American women journalists
Associated Press reporters
Living people
Houston Chronicle people
Moody College of Communication alumni
Pulitzer Prize for Commentary winners
Pulitzer Prize for Editorial Writing winners